Victor Baluda and Alexander Kudryavtsev were the defending champions, but Baluda did not participate this year. Kudryavtsev played alongside Denys Molchanov and successfully defended the title.

Seeds

Draw

External links
 Main Draw

Open Castilla y Leon - Doubles
Open Castilla y León doubles
2015 Open Castilla y León